Stachyandra merana is a species of plant in the genus Stachyandra in the family Picrodendraceae.

References 

Picrodendraceae